Mothar Mountain is a rural locality in the Gympie Region, Queensland, Australia. In the  Mothar Mountain had a population of 534 people.

Geography
The southern and eastern parts of the locality constitute the western half of Woondum National Park. The Mothar Mountain Rock Pools are in a day-use area at the entrance to the National Park.

History 
Mothar Mountain rock pools is believed to have been a site of significance to the Aboriginal people of the area but unfortunately little is known. MOTHAR Mountain Provisional School opened on July 1908. On 1 January 1909 it became Mothar Mountain State School. In 1929 the name was corrected to Mothar Mountain State School. It closed on 13 July 1970. It was located on the western side of the Noosa Road north of the junction with Shadbolt Road, roughly opposite the Mothar Mountain Hall (approx ). The school building is no longer extant.

The Mothar Mountain Hall was built in 1957.

In the  Mothar Mountain had a population of 534 people.

Heritage listings 
Mothar Mountain Hall on Noosa Road is listed on the Gympie Local Heritage Register.

Amenities 
Mothar Mountain Hall is on the northern corner of the junction of Noosa Road and Shadbolt Road.

References 

Gympie Region
Localities in Queensland